M. Thiyagarajah is a Sri Lankan Tamil politician and provincial councillor.

Thiyagarajah contested the 2013 provincial council election as one of the Tamil National Alliance's candidates in Vavuniya District and was elected to the Northern Provincial Council. After the election he was appointed to assist the Minister of Agriculture, Livestock, Irrigation and Environment on animal husbandry. He took his oath as provincial councillor in front of attorney-at-law K. Thayaparan at Vavuniya on 16 October 2013.

References

Eelam People's Revolutionary Liberation Front politicians
Living people
Members of the Northern Provincial Council
People from Northern Province, Sri Lanka
Sri Lankan Tamil politicians
Tamil National Alliance politicians
Year of birth missing (living people)